David R. Russell (23 September 1935 – 21 March 2018) was a builder who for many years collected antique woodworking tools.

Career and collecting
David Richard Russell was born at Burneside near Kendal in Westmorland (now part of Cumbria), England, the younger son of Albert, a worker in a Cumbrian gunpowder-keg factory, and Alice Russell (née Mason). He left school early to work alongside his brother as an apprentice to a cabinet-maker and joiner in Kendal. One of his first jobs as a young apprentice was working on site with his brother at Sizergh Castle, near Kendal.

"His first love was the foreman's Norris jointing-plane, which he was not allowed to touch however much his fingers tingled," wrote Huon Mallalieu in The Times. "Seven years later his passion was assuaged, but not extinguished, when he bought his first Norris for £5 in a Sunday antiques market." This was the beginning of what was to become one of the foremost collections of woodworking tools in the Western world.

Although David Russell's career was to follow a different path, one of his lifelong passions was wood-carving. After completing his National Service in Malaya he went into the building trade, working first of all in Bournemouth and then for Wimpey in London. Back in Cumbria he formed a partnership with his brother and by the end of his career their building firm, by then known as Russell Armer Ltd, employed some 250 men. His firm's building project in collaboration with the local architect Mike Walford at Webster's Yard, Kendal, was reviewed in depth in the Architects' Journal.

Throughout his working life and well into his retirement Russell could be seen raising his paddle at tool auctions on both sides of the Atlantic as he bid for some of the finest tools on offer.

When tool historians and tool book writers began to pay him visits to see his collection and publish items from it, he came to realise that what he had amassed was worthy of a book in its own right. He struggled to pull together a team to bring the book to fruition, but after much toil spanning several years the book was published to critical acclaim in October 2010. The dust-jacket text summarises the book's aim as one of "providing a broad survey of hand tool-making from prehistory to today."
As David Linley wrote in the foreword: "[David Russell] is to be congratulated on amassing with unerring eye such a fascinating array of tools."

Eve M. Kahn, writing in  The New York Times averred that "The Russell collection volume [. . .] was intended to glamorize unsung innovations". Mark Bridge in his review in Antiques Trade Gazette was more specific about the numerous photographs by the Courtauld Institute-trained photographer James Austin : "This is a truly huge work . . . and is quite unrivalled in the size and quality of its illustrations. [James Austin] has managed to capture the elusive qualities of balance, texture and patina which make the finest tools a pleasure to handle, frequently lifting them into the realm of folk art".

Bibliography
 Russell, David R. with Robert Lesage and photographs by James Austin, cataloguing assisted by Peter Hackett, foreword by David Linley. Antique Woodworking Tools: Their Craftsmanship from the Earliest Times to the Twentieth Century.  Cambridge: John Adamson (2010)

Other books featuring tools from the David Russell collection
 Eaton, Reg. The Ultimate Brace: A Unique Product of Victorian Sheffield. King's Lynn: Erica Jane Publishing (1989) 
 Hambly, Maya. Drawing Instruments: 1580–1980. London: Sotheby's Publications (1988) 
 Lampert, Nigel. Through Much Tribulation: Stewart Spiers and the Planemakers of Ayr. Pascoe Vale, Victoria, Australia: Oliver Publications (1999) 
 Nagyszalanczy, Sandor. The Art of Fine Tools. Newtown, CT: Taunton Press Inc.: Paperback (2000)  
 Proudfoot, Christopher, and Philip Walker. Woodworking Tools. Oxford: Phaidon, Christie's Collectors Guides (1984) 
 Rees, Jane and Mark. The Rule Book: Measuring for the Trades. Lakeville, MN: Astragal Press (2010)

Notes

External links 
Obituaries and tributes
 "David Russell: Collector and authority on traditional woodworking tools", Daily Telegraph, 1 May 2018, p. 29
 "David Russell obituary", The Guardian, 11 June 2018, "Journal", p. 11
 "Obituary: David R Russell, expert on vintage woodworking tools and builder", Scotsman, 1 May 2018, p. 43
 "David Russell: Builder and collector", Yorkshire Post, 21 April 2018
 "David R Russell, the tool collector extraordinaire", Antiques Trade Gazette, issue 2339, 28 April 2018, p. 62
 "David Russell, businessman and expert on Britain's industrial past", Herald, 14 April 2018
 "Woodworking tools collector dies aged 82", Sheffield Telegraph, 26 April 2018, p. 28
 "David R. Russell - Some Thoughts on His Legacy", Tools for Working Wood, 18 April 2018
 "Obituary: David R. Russell", Norris Planes, n.d.
 "In Memoriam—David R. Russell", Shavings, Newsletter of the Early American Industries Association, Inc., Issue 248, Spring 2018, p. 5
 "Obituary", Tool Chest, Hand Tool Preservation Association of Australia Inc, no. 128, May 2018, p. 11

Other 
 Antique Woodworking Tools (book)
 Helen Perkins: "Antique Tools under the Hammer" Westmorland Gazette, 28 September 2011 

1935 births
2018 deaths
British collectors
British art collectors
People from Kendal